Prof. Kamla Srivastava (born 1 September 1933) is an Indian folk music singer. She retired as assistant professor in Musicology-cum-practical of Bhatkhande Music Institute, deemed university of Lucknow. An artiste much in demand and invited to sing at programs throughout the month, she comes from the family of artists and poets. She sings folk, light and classical music at All India Radio, Doordarshan and Sri Lanka Radio. She is also a poetess and writes lyrics in Awadhi, Bhojpuri and Hindi.

She published her book Geet Vatika on 8 January 2010 and has received awards and citations from Sangeet Natak Academy, UP, Uttar Pradesh Sansthan and more.

She was awarded the highest Award of the Government of Uttar Pradesh, Yash Bharati, in March 2016.

Books 
Geet Vatika (2010)

Awards 
Veerangana (2008) [Sanskar Bharti]
Shastriya and Lok Sangeet (2010) [Sanskar Bharti]
Lok Geet Gayan (2001) [Sangeet Natak Academy, Uttar Pradesh]
Devi Ahilya (2013–14) [Chief Minister, Madhya Pradesh]
Purvaiya Atithi (2014) [Purvaiya Lok Kala Sansthan]
Gomti Gaurav (2015) [Gomti Utsav Samiti]
Yash Bharati (2016) [Chief Minister, Uttar Pradesh]
Sangeet Sindhu (2016) [Sur Taal Sangam Sanstha]
Sirmaur (2017) [Rhythm Foundation, Uttar Pradesh]
Sashakt Nari (2017) [Rudraksh Welfare Society]
Sahitya Sangeet (2017) [Bharatiya Lekhika Parishad]
Devi Samman (2018) [Chief Minister, Uttar Pradesh]
Kala Sadhak (2019) [Sanskar Bharti]
Lok Ratna (2019) [Lok Sanskriti Shodh sansthan]
Awadh ki Shaan (2019) [Ramaneek Society]
Women Honour (2019)
Rang Bharti (2020)

References

External links 
beatofindia.com
lyricsindia.net

1933 births
Living people
Indian folk musicians